This list comprises all players who have signed with the CF Montréal since the team's first Major League Soccer season in 2012 during league calendar.

List of players 

Competitive matches only. Players in bold are now on the team roster. Stats and roster are accurate as of March 20, 2023

List of Goalies 

Competitive matches only. Players in bold are now on the team roster. Stats and roster are accurate as of March 20, 2023 2020 season.

Players without Matches 

 Bryan Arguez
 Jason Beaulieu
 James Bissue
 George Campbell
 Paolo DelPiccolo
 Keesean Ferdinand
 Gienir García
 Tomas Giraldo
 Ousman Jabang
 Evan James
 Mechack Jérôme
 Logan Ketterer 
 Thomas Meilleur-Giguère
 Zakaria Messoudi
 Luca Ricci
 Maxi Rodríguez
 Steeven Saba
 John Smits
 Gege Soriola
 Jules-Anthony Vilsaint

Former Montreal Impact Academy Players

 Nazim Belguendouz
 Kevin Cossette
 John Dinkota
 Chakib Hocine
 Jems Geffrard
 Daniel Fabrizi
 Mastanabal Kacher
 Mylord Kasai
 Aron Mkungilwa
 Victor N'Diaye
 David Paulmin
 Zachary Sukunda
 Stefan Vukovic
 Valentin Radevich
 Mélé Temguia
 Mircea Ilcu
 Jimmy-Shammar Sanon
 Alessandro Riggi
 Marco Dominguez
 Fabio Morelli
 Brandon Onkony
 Jon-Michael Vieira

Notes

References

Sources

Montreal Impact
 
Association football player non-biographical articles